is a railway station in the city of Matsumoto, Nagano, Japan, operated by the private railway operating company Alpico Kōtsū.

Lines
Shinano-Arai Station is a station on the Kamikōchi Line and is 1.9 kilometers from the terminus of the line at Matsumoto Station.

Station layout
The station has one ground-level island platform serving two tracks, connected to the station building by a level crossing.

Platforms

Adjacent stations

History
The station opened on 2 October 1921. A new station building was completed in 1993.

Passenger statistics
In fiscal 2016, the station was used by an average of 36 passengers daily (boarding passengers only).

Surrounding area

See also
 List of railway stations in Japan

References

External links
 

Railway stations in Japan opened in 1921
Railway stations in Matsumoto City
Kamikōchi Line